Groupe Média TFO is a public media organization created by the government of Ontario, Canada, which produces and distributes French-language educational content, available on various platforms, including the TFO television channel, TFO Éducation and various YouTube channels. Groupe Média TFO manages a television channel, 200 websites, 20 mobile applications and games, 15 subscription platforms and 14 social media platforms.

Apart from its educational and youth content (for audiences aged 2 to 17), Groupe Média TFO produces and broadcasts cultural and current affairs content for adults. The group is the only French-language, multimedia network in Canada with its headquarters outside of Quebec.

History 
Before 1987,  a few hours of daily French programming was offered by TVOntario. On January 1, 1987, Ontario's educational French-language television channel, called La Chaîne, was officially launched. In 1995, La Chaîne was renamed TFO. TFO was originally created to provide content applicable to the French-language education system in Ontario. Services has since expanded to include EduLulu, a public evaluation service for mobile educational applications, designed for francophones and anglophones from Ontario and elsewhere.

In 2006, the Ministry of Education for Ontario created a public media corporation – the Ontario French-Language Educational Communications Authority (OTÉLFO) – and provided funding for digital technologies and HD to meet the needs of Ontario's francophone linguistic minority. TFO, the OTÉLFO's television channel, offers programming focused on education, with shows for children, teens and adults.

Starting in 2010, in response to increasing use of smartphones, tablets, computers, and smart boards, as well as new ways of watching televised content, such as binge-watching, TFO's board of directors initiated a technological shift to provide content for these platforms. In September 2010, Glenn O'Farrell was named president and CEO of the OTÉLFO. In January 2011, l'OTÉLFO, by then publicly known as Groupe Média TFO began the development YouTube channels, including Mini TFO, a children's channel. Groupe launched a Mini TFO application in Apple's App Store. To extend its programming for the Francophone community, Groupe Média TFO began a collaboration in 2012, with La Cité collégiale.
 
In 2013, Groupe Média TFO organized the Sommet des tablettistes, an international conference on the impact of new technologies on education, and in April 2014 initiated the EduLulu project, an evaluation service for educational applications in Canada.4

TFO adapted its educational content designed for teachers to the digital environment, and the result was TFO Éducation, an interactive service offering teachers a collection of about 5,000 educational tools. The service has been licensed by 12 French-language school boards and 60 English-language school boards in Ontario

In 2015 TFO submitted a proposal to the CRTC that all BDUs and satellite TV providers in Canada be required to include the channel in their lineup.  The CRTC declined the proposal.

References

External links
TFO Annual Report

Organizations based in Toronto
Television production companies of Canada
Television broadcasting companies of Canada